Jeffrey Swartz (born March 20, 1960) is an American businessman, and was formerly CEO of Timberland, founded by his grandfather, Nathan Swartz. He sold Timberland to VF Corporation in 2011.

Early life
He was born on March 20, 1960 to a Jewish family, the son of Sidney and Judith Swartz. He was educated at Phillips Academy, Andover, Massachusetts, followed by a bachelor's degree from Brown University and an  MBA from Dartmouth College, New Hampshire.

Career
For 15 years Swartz was the CEO of Timberland, a company founded in 1952 by his grandfather.

Swartz owned the majority of the voting shares for Timberland. In 2011, as CEO, he was responsible for the sale of Timberland to VF Corporation for $2 billion.

Personal life
Swartz is married, with three sons.

References

1960 births
Living people
American fashion businesspeople
Brown University alumni
Dartmouth College alumni
Phillips Academy alumni
21st-century American Jews